David Knudsen Levine (born c. 1955) is department of Economics and Robert Schuman Center for Advanced Study Joint Chair at the European University Institute; he is John H. Biggs Distinguished Professor of Economics Emeritus at Washington University in St. Louis. His research includes the study of intellectual property and endogenous growth in dynamic general equilibrium models, the endogenous formation of preferences, social norms and institutions, learning in games, and game theory applications to experimental economics.

Biography 
At UCLA, Levine obtained a B.A. in mathematics in 1977, and an M.A. in economics in the same year. He was awarded a Ph.D. in economics at MIT in June 1981. He became an assistant professor of economics at UCLA in July 1981, an associate professor of economics at the University of Minnesota in 1987, and a professor of economics at UCLA in the same year. In 1997 he became the Armen Alchian Professor of Economics at UCLA. In 2006 he moved to Washington University in St. Louis, where he became the John H. Biggs Distinguished Professor of Economics.

Levine was the coeditor of the Review of Economic Dynamics from November 1996 to June 2001, and of Econometrica from July 2003 to June 2008. He presided the Society for Economic Dynamics from July 2006 to June 2009.

Levine is a Fellow of the Econometric Society since 1989 and a research associate at NBER since 2006.

Research 
David K. Levine conducts ongoing research in general equilibrium theory, focusing specifically on growth theory, innovation, and intellectual property. Collaborating with Michele Boldrin, Levine examines the role of increasing returns in growth and innovation.  They posit that little evidence exists for increasing returns at the aggregate level, and thus argue that there is no reason to believe that increasing returns play an important role in growth. This theory concludes that existing claims for the necessity of intellectual property in the process of growth and innovation are greatly exaggerated.

Levine also conducts research in the field of dynamic games.  He established with Drew Fudenberg that a long-lived player playing in opposition to short-lived players can substitute reputation for commitment. He developed with Eric Maskin the first "folk theorem" for games in which players do not directly observe each other's decisions, with applications for learning in games.  They argued that while learning theories cannot provide detailed descriptions of non-equilibrium behavior, they act as a useful tool in understanding which equilibria are likely to emerge.  One example of this, they put forward, explains how superstitions survive in the face of rational learning.

Levine currently studies the endogenous formation of preferences and social norms.  His analysis of experimental anomalies explores some of the limitations of the standard economic model of self-interested individuals.

Publications 
 The Theory of Learning in Games, co-author with Drew Fudenberg
 Against Intellectual Monopoly, co-author with Michele Boldrin

Working papers 
 http://www.dklevine.com/papers.htm

Podcast 
 http://www.dklevine.com/podcasts.xml

References

External links 
 Economic and Game Theory, by David K. Levine
 Against Monopoly: Defending the Right to Innovate
 Freshmeat account, author of cross-platform UNIX software
 Copyright Controversies: Freedom, Property, Content Creation, and the DMCA, a Cato Institute conference at which Levine spoke.
 Against Intellectual Property lecture, a recording of a free public lecture by David Levine at Simon Fraser University.
 Levine's academic CV

1950s births
Living people
20th-century American economists
21st-century American economists
Game theorists
Intellectual property activism
University of California, Los Angeles alumni
MIT School of Humanities, Arts, and Social Sciences alumni
University of California, Los Angeles faculty
University of Minnesota faculty
Washington University in St. Louis faculty
Academic staff of the European University Institute
Fellows of the Econometric Society